Daniel Karlsson (born 31 August 1981 in Norrahammar, Jönköping, Sweden) is a Swedish singer and songwriter. He later on took the name The Moniker as his stage name.

As Daniel Karlsson 
Karlsson participated in Idol 2007. He finished in fourth place behind winner Marie Picasso, runner-up Amanda Jenssen and third-placed Andreas Sjöberg. His interpretation of John Farnham's "You're the Voice" was included in the album Det bästa från Idol 2007 (The Best from Idol 2007).

In October 2008, Karlsson released his first single, called "Would You Believe". A music video was also released to accompany the song.

As The Moniker 
In March 2011, under the name The Moniker, he took part in the Melodifestivalen 2011 with his a song he had composed entitled "Oh My God!" and coming third behind winner Eric Saade with "Popular" and runner-up Danny Saucedo with "In the Club".

He again took part in 2012 with the song "I Wanna Be Chris Isaak (This Is Just the Beginning)." After the first round of voting it was revealed that he came last, failing to advance further in the competition.

In popular culture 
Daniel Karlsson took part, alongside Karl Martindahl and Robin Bengtsson in the charity single "Wake Up World", the official release for "Hjälp Haiti".

Discography

Albums
as The Moniker

Singles
As Daniel Karlsson

As The Moniker

References

External links 

Idol (Swedish TV series) participants
Swedish songwriters
Living people
1981 births
People from Jönköping
21st-century Swedish singers
21st-century Swedish male singers
Melodifestivalen contestants of 2012
Melodifestivalen contestants of 2011